Pedda Manushulu is a 1999 Telugu-language film directed by Boyina Subba Rao under the Suresh Productions banner. The film stars Suman and Rachana. The film was an adaptation of Kommanapally Ganapathy Ran’s novel, Shatadinotsavam.

Cast
Suman as Sagar 
Rachana as Shravanthi 
Heera Rajagopal as Bhanumathi 
Kaikala Satyanarayana as Balakotaiah 
Srihari
Kota Srinivasa Rao as Chinchuramaiah 
Raja Ravindra
Narsing Yadav
S. P. Balasubrahmanyam
D. Ramanaidu (guest appearance)

Soundtrack

Eeshwar composed the music. Music released under Aditya Music Company.

Release
A critic from The Hindu wrote "Suman looks too heavy to prance around with the heroines. Srihari as the bridegroom, who keeps stripping to show off his biceps frequently, is irritating. The comic track is very poor. Musical score by S A Rajkumar is deafening. On the whole a downbeat movie."

References

1990s Telugu-language films
1999 films
Films based on Indian novels